Chullo (from ) is an Andean style of hat with earflaps, made from vicuña, alpaca, llama or sheep's wool. Alpaca has wool-like qualities that help to insulate its wearer from the harsh elements in the Andean Mountain region. Chullos often have ear-flaps that can be tied under the chin, to further warm the wearer's head.

Hats have been used in the Andean Mountain region by indigenous peoples for thousands of years. Wearing different types and colors has a significance among certain Andean natives. According to Peruvian historian Arturo Jiménez Borja, the Chullo has its origins in the cultural exchange between Spaniards, who incorporated elements of their birretes and the original hat of the Andeans.

See also
 Andean culture
 Andean textiles
 Aguayo
 Chuspas
 Lliklla

References

External links 
 

Latin American clothing
Hats
Bolivian clothing
Chilean clothing
Peruvian clothing